Górowo may refer to:

Górowo, Lower Silesian Voivodeship (south-west Poland)
Górowo, Nidzica County in Warmian-Masurian Voivodeship (north Poland)
Górowo, Olsztyn County in Warmian-Masurian Voivodeship (north Poland)
Górowo Iławeckie, in Warmian-Masurian Voivodeship (north Poland)